Darrian Robinson (born 1994) is an American chess player. As of 2014, she was the highest rated African American female player in the United States Chess Federation system. She holds the USCF title of Candidate Master (August 2012) and her most recent USCF rating is 2086 (September 2016).

Darrian's chess career became notable in 2006, when she ranked 6th in USCF's girls under 13 ranking and represented the United States in Batumi, Georgia, at the World Youth Chess Championship. According to a New York Times article, the 2006 World Youth Chess Championship was the first time that two African-American players represented the United States in the tournament.

Robinson graduated from the University of Chicago in 2016. During her tenure there she held a White House Internship, studied at the London School of Economics, and worked at Hillary Clinton’s Iowa campaign headquarters in Des Moines.

References

External links
 
 

1994 births
Living people
American female chess players
African-American chess players
University of Chicago alumni
21st-century African-American people
21st-century African-American women